Huainan South railway station is a railway station on the Shangqiu–Hangzhou high-speed railway in Tianjia'an District, Huainan, Anhui, China. Opened on 1 December 2019, it is the third railway station in the city.

See also
Huainan railway station
Huainan East railway station

References

Railway stations in Anhui
Railway stations in China opened in 2019